Amizo of Turin (died 1000) was an Italian bishop. He was bishop of Turin from 966 until his death in 1000. 
Based on an early modern Milanese chronicle, it is sometimes argued that Amizo was the son of Arduin Glaber of Turin.

Sometime between 983 and 987, Amizo consecrated abbey of Sacra di San Michele, founded by Hugh of Montboissier.
In 989 Amizo granted the parish of S. Maria di Quadraciana to the nuns at San Pietro in Turin, enriching them with property at Scarnafigi and Cervignasco.
Amizo obtained two imperial diplomas confirming the church of Turin in all its possessions: the first was issued by Otto II in 981, and the second by Otto III in 998.
In 997 Amizo participated in the synod of Pavia, presided over by Pope Gregory V.

References
F. Savio, Gli antichi vescovi d’Italia. Il Piemonte (Turin, 1899).
G. Casiraghi, ‘Dal monte Pirchiriano alla cristianità: S. Michele della Chiusa e le sue dipendenze,’ in P. Cancian, G. Casiraghi, eds., Vicende, dipendenze e documenti dell’abbazia di S. Michele della Chiusa (Turin, 1993), pp. 14–22.
 T. Calchi, Rerum patriae seu Mediolanensis historiae libri XX (Milan, 1627). 
G.T. Terraneo, La principessa Adelaide contessa di Torino con nuovi documenti illustrata (Turin, 1759), 2 vols. 
 G. Sergi, ‘Una grande circoscrizione del regno italico: la marca arduinica di Torino,’ Studi Medievali XII (1971), 637-712.

Notes

Bishops of Turin
10th-century Italian bishops

it:Amizone (vescovo di Torino)